Sir Arthur Seymour Sullivan  (13 May 1842 – 22 November 1900) was an English composer. He is best known for 14 operatic collaborations with the dramatist W. S. Gilbert, including H.M.S. Pinafore, The Pirates of Penzance and The Mikado. His works include 24 operas, 11 major orchestral works, ten choral works and oratorios, two ballets, incidental music to several plays, and numerous church pieces, songs, and piano and chamber pieces. His hymns and songs include "Onward, Christian Soldiers" and "The Lost Chord".

The son of a military bandmaster, Sullivan composed his first anthem at the age of eight and was later a soloist in the boys' choir of the Chapel Royal. In 1856, at 14, he was awarded the first Mendelssohn Scholarship by the Royal Academy of Music, which allowed him to study at the academy and then at the Leipzig Conservatoire in Germany. His graduation piece, incidental music to Shakespeare's The Tempest (1861), was received with acclaim on its first performance in London. Among his early major works were a ballet, L'Île Enchantée (1864), a symphony, a cello concerto (both 1866), and his Overture di Ballo (1870). To supplement the income from his concert works he wrote hymns, parlour ballads and other light pieces, and worked as a church organist and music teacher.

In 1866 Sullivan composed a one-act comic opera, Cox and Box, which is still widely performed. He wrote his first opera with W. S. Gilbert, Thespis, in 1871. Four years later, the impresario Richard D'Oyly Carte engaged Gilbert and Sullivan to create a one-act piece, Trial by Jury (1875). Its box-office success led to a series of twelve full-length comic operas by the collaborators. After the extraordinary success of H.M.S. Pinafore (1878) and The Pirates of Penzance (1879), Carte used his profits from the partnership to build the Savoy Theatre in 1881, and their joint works became known as the Savoy operas. Among the best known of the later operas are The Mikado (1885) and The Gondoliers (1889). Gilbert broke from Sullivan and Carte in 1890, after a quarrel over expenses at the Savoy. They reunited in the 1890s for two more operas, but these did not achieve the popularity of their earlier works.

Sullivan's infrequent serious pieces during the 1880s included two cantatas, The Martyr of Antioch (1880) and The Golden Legend (1886), his most popular choral work. He also wrote incidental music for West End productions of several Shakespeare plays, and held conducting and academic appointments. Sullivan's only grand opera, Ivanhoe, though initially successful in 1891, has rarely been revived. In his last decade Sullivan continued to compose comic operas with various librettists and wrote other major and minor works. He died at the age of 58, regarded as Britain's foremost composer. His comic opera style served as a model for generations of musical theatre composers that followed, and his music is still frequently performed, recorded and pastiched.

Life and career

Beginnings

Sullivan was born on 13 May 1842 in Lambeth, London, the younger of the two children, both boys, of Thomas Sullivan (1805–1866) and his wife, Mary Clementina née Coghlan (1811–1882). His father was a military bandmaster, clarinettist and music teacher, born in Ireland and raised in Chelsea, London; his mother was English born, of Irish and Italian descent. Thomas Sullivan was based from 1845 to 1857 at the Royal Military College, Sandhurst, where he was the bandmaster and taught music privately to supplement his income. Young Arthur became proficient with many of the instruments in the band and composed an anthem, "By the Waters of Babylon", when he was eight. He later recalled:

While recognising the boy's obvious talent, his father knew the insecurity of a musical career and discouraged him from pursuing it. Sullivan studied at a private school in Bayswater. In 1854 he persuaded his parents and the headmaster to allow him to apply for membership in the choir of the Chapel Royal. Despite concerns that, at nearly 12 years of age, Sullivan was too old to give much service as a treble before his voice broke, he was accepted and soon became a soloist. By 1856, he was promoted to "first boy". Even at this age, his health was delicate, and he was easily fatigued.

Sullivan flourished under the training of the Reverend Thomas Helmore, Master of the Children of the Chapel Royal, and began to write anthems and songs. Helmore encouraged his compositional talent and arranged for one of his pieces, "O Israel", to be published in 1855, his first published work. Helmore enlisted Sullivan's assistance in creating harmonisations for a volume of The Hymnal Noted and arranged for the boy's compositions to be performed; one anthem was performed at the Chapel Royal in St James's Palace under the direction of Sir George Smart.

Mendelssohn scholar

In 1856 the Royal Academy of Music awarded the first Mendelssohn Scholarship to the 14-year-old Sullivan, granting him a year's training at the academy. His principal teacher there was John Goss, whose own teacher, Thomas Attwood, had been a pupil of Mozart. He studied piano with William Sterndale Bennett (the future head of the academy) and Arthur O'Leary. During this first year at the academy Sullivan continued to sing solos with the Chapel Royal, which provided a small amount of spending money.

Sullivan's scholarship was extended to a second year, and in 1858, in what his biographer Arthur Jacobs calls an "extraordinary gesture of confidence", the scholarship committee extended his grant for a third year so that he could study in Germany, at the Leipzig Conservatoire. There, Sullivan studied composition with Julius Rietz and Carl Reinecke, counterpoint with Moritz Hauptmann and Ernst Richter, and the piano with Louis Plaidy and Ignaz Moscheles. He was trained in Mendelssohn's ideas and techniques but was also exposed to a variety of styles, including those of Schubert, Verdi, Bach and Wagner. Visiting a synagogue, he was so struck by some of the cadences and progressions of the music that thirty years later he could recall them for use in his grand opera, Ivanhoe. He became friendly with the future impresario Carl Rosa and the violinist Joseph Joachim, among others.

The academy renewed Sullivan's scholarship to allow him a second year of study at Leipzig. For his third and last year there, his father scraped together the money for living expenses, and the conservatoire assisted by waiving its fees. Sullivan's graduation piece, completed in 1861, was a suite of incidental music to Shakespeare's The Tempest. Revised and expanded, it was performed at the Crystal Palace in 1862, a year after his return to London; The Musical Times described it as a sensation. He began building a reputation as England's most promising young composer.

Rising composer

Sullivan embarked on his composing career with a series of ambitious works, interspersed with hymns, parlour songs and other light pieces in a more commercial vein. His compositions were not enough to support him financially, and between 1861 and 1872 he worked as a church organist, which he enjoyed; as a music teacher, which he hated and gave up as soon as he could; and as an arranger of vocal scores of popular operas. He took an early opportunity to compose several pieces for royalty in connection with the wedding of the Prince of Wales in 1863.

With The Masque at Kenilworth (Birmingham Festival, 1864), Sullivan began his association with works for voice and orchestra. While an organist at the Royal Italian Opera, Covent Garden, he composed his first ballet, L'Île Enchantée (1864). His Irish Symphony and Cello Concerto (both 1866) were his only works in their respective genres. In the same year, his Overture in C (In Memoriam), commemorating the recent death of his father, was a commission from the Norwich Festival. It achieved considerable popularity. In June 1867 the Philharmonic Society gave the first performance of his overture Marmion. The reviewer for The Times called it "another step in advance on the part of the only composer of any remarkable promise that just at present we can boast." In October, Sullivan travelled with George Grove to Vienna in search of neglected scores by Schubert. They unearthed manuscript copies of symphonies and vocal music, and were particularly elated by their final discovery, the incidental music to Rosamunde.

Sullivan's first attempt at opera, The Sapphire Necklace (1863–64) to a libretto by Henry F. Chorley, was not produced and is now lost, except for the overture and two songs that were separately published. His first surviving opera, Cox and Box (1866), was written for a private performance. It then received charity performances in London and Manchester, and was later produced at the Gallery of Illustration, where it ran for an extraordinary 264 performances. W. S. Gilbert, writing in Fun magazine, pronounced the score superior to F. C. Burnand's libretto. Sullivan and Burnand were soon commissioned by Thomas German Reed for a two-act opera, The Contrabandista (1867; revised and expanded as The Chieftain in 1894), but it did not do as well. Among Sullivan's early part songs is "The Long Day Closes" (1868). Sullivan's last major work of the 1860s was a short oratorio, The Prodigal Son, first given in Worcester Cathedral as part of the 1869 Three Choirs Festival to much praise.

1870s: first collaborations with Gilbert

Sullivan's most enduring orchestral work, the Overture di Ballo, was composed for the Birmingham Festival in 1870. The same year, Sullivan first met the poet and dramatist W. S. Gilbert. In 1871 Sullivan published his only song cycle, The Window, to words by Tennyson, and he wrote the first of a series of incidental music scores for productions of Shakespeare plays. He also composed a dramatic cantata, On Shore and Sea, for the opening of the London International Exhibition, and the hymn "Onward, Christian Soldiers", with words by Sabine Baring-Gould. The Salvation Army adopted the latter as its favoured processional, and it became Sullivan's best-known hymn.

At the end of 1871 John Hollingshead, proprietor of London's Gaiety Theatre, commissioned Sullivan to work with Gilbert to create the burlesque-style comic opera Thespis. Played as a Christmas entertainment, it ran through to Easter 1872, a good run for such a piece. Gilbert and Sullivan then went their separate ways until they collaborated on three parlour ballads in late 1874 and early 1875.

Sullivan's large-scale works of the early 1870s were the Festival Te Deum (Crystal Palace, 1872) and the oratorio The Light of the World (Birmingham Festival, 1873). He provided incidental music for productions of The Merry Wives of Windsor at the Gaiety in 1874 and Henry VIII at the Theatre Royal, Manchester, in 1877.  He continued to compose hymns throughout the decade. In 1873 Sullivan contributed songs to Burnand's Christmas "drawing room extravaganza", The Miller and His Man.

In 1875 the manager of the Royalty Theatre, Richard D'Oyly Carte, needed a short piece to fill out a bill with Offenbach's La Périchole. Carte had conducted Sullivan's Cox and Box. Remembering that Gilbert had suggested a libretto to him, Carte engaged Sullivan to set it, and the result was the one-act comic opera Trial by Jury. Trial, starring Sullivan's brother Fred as the Learned Judge, became a surprise hit, earning glowing praise from the critics and playing for 300 performances over its first few seasons. The Daily Telegraph commented that the piece illustrated the composer's "great capacity for dramatic writing of the lighter class", and other reviews emphasised the felicitous combination of Gilbert's words and Sullivan's music. One wrote, "it seems, as in the great Wagnerian operas, as though poem and music had proceeded simultaneously from one and the same brain." A few months later, another Sullivan one-act comic opera opened: The Zoo, with a libretto by B. C. Stephenson. It was less successful than Trial, and for the next 15 years Sullivan's sole operatic collaborator was Gilbert; the partners created a further twelve operas together.

Sullivan also turned out more than 80 popular songs and parlour ballads, most of them written before the end of the 1870s. His first popular song was "Orpheus with his Lute" (1866), and a well-received part song was "Oh! Hush thee, my Babie" (1867). The best known of his songs is "The Lost Chord" (1877, lyrics by Adelaide Anne Procter), written at the bedside of his brother during Fred's last illness. The sheet music for his best-received songs sold in large numbers and was an important part of his income.

In this decade, Sullivan's conducting appointments included the Glasgow Choral Union concerts (1875–77) and the Royal Aquarium Theatre, London (1876). In addition to his appointment as Professor of Composition at the Royal Academy of Music, of which he was a Fellow, he was appointed as the first Principal of the National Training School for Music in 1876. He accepted the latter post reluctantly, fearing that discharging the duties thoroughly would leave too little time for composing; in this he was correct. He was not effective in the post, and resigned in 1881.

Sullivan's next collaboration with Gilbert, The Sorcerer (1877), ran for 178 performances, a success by the standards of the day, but H.M.S. Pinafore (1878), which followed it, turned Gilbert and Sullivan into an international phenomenon. Sullivan composed the bright and cheerful music of Pinafore while suffering from excruciating pain from a kidney stone. Pinafore ran for 571 performances in London, then the second-longest theatrical run in history, and more than 150 unauthorised productions were quickly mounted in America alone. Among other favourable reviews, The Times noted that the opera was an early attempt at the establishment of a "national musical stage" free from risqué French "improprieties" and without the "aid" of Italian and German musical models. The Times and several of the other papers agreed that although the piece was entertaining, Sullivan was capable of higher art, and frivolous light opera would hold him back. This criticism would follow Sullivan throughout his career.

In 1879 Sullivan suggested to a reporter from The New York Times the secret of his success with Gilbert: "His ideas are as suggestive for music as they are quaint and laughable. His numbers ... always give me musical ideas." Pinafore was followed by The Pirates of Penzance in 1879, which opened in New York and then ran in London for 363 performances.

Early 1880s

In 1880 Sullivan was appointed director of the triennial Leeds Music Festival. He had earlier been commissioned to write a sacred choral work for the festival and chose, as its subject, Henry Hart Milman's 1822 dramatic poem based on the life and death of St Margaret of Antioch. The Martyr of Antioch was first performed at the Leeds Festival in October 1880. Gilbert adapted the libretto for Sullivan, who, in gratitude, presented his collaborator with an engraved silver cup inscribed "W.S. Gilbert from his friend Arthur Sullivan." Sullivan was not a showy conductor, and some thought him dull and old-fashioned on the podium, but Martyr had an enthusiastic reception and was frequently revived. Other critics and performers had favorable reactions to Sullivan's conducting, and he had a busy conducting career in parallel with his composing career, including seven Leeds Festivals among many other appointments. Sullivan invariably conducted the opening nights of the Gilbert and Sullivan operas.

Carte opened the next Gilbert and Sullivan piece, Patience, in April 1881 at London's Opera Comique, where their past three operas had played. In October, Patience transferred to the new, larger, state-of-the-art Savoy Theatre, built with the profits of the previous Gilbert and Sullivan works. The rest of the partnership's collaborations were produced at the Savoy, and are widely known as the "Savoy operas". Iolanthe (1882), the first new opera to open at the Savoy, was Gilbert and Sullivan's fourth hit in a row. Sullivan, despite the financial security of writing for the Savoy, increasingly viewed the composition of comic operas as unimportant, beneath his skills, and also repetitious. After Iolanthe, Sullivan had not intended to write a new work with Gilbert, but he suffered a serious financial loss when his broker went bankrupt in November 1882. Therefore, he concluded that his financial needs obliged him to continue writing Savoy operas. In February 1883, he and Gilbert signed a five-year agreement with Carte, requiring them to produce a new comic opera on six months' notice.

On 22 May 1883 Sullivan was knighted by Queen Victoria for his "services ... rendered to the promotion of the art of music" in Britain. The musical establishment, and many critics, believed that this should end his career as a composer of comic opera – that a musical knight should not stoop below oratorio or grand opera. Having just signed the five-year agreement, Sullivan suddenly felt trapped. The next opera, Princess Ida (1884, the duo's only three-act, blank verse work), had a shorter run than its four predecessors; Sullivan's score was praised. With box office receipts lagging in March 1884, Carte gave the six months' notice, under the partnership contract, requiring a new opera. Sullivan's close friend, the composer Frederic Clay, had recently suffered a career-ending stroke at the age of 45. Sullivan, reflecting on this, on his own long-standing kidney problems, and on his desire to devote himself to more serious music, replied to Carte, "[I]t is impossible for me to do another piece of the character of those already written by Gilbert and myself."

Gilbert had already started work on a new opera in which the characters fell in love against their wills after taking a magic lozenge. Sullivan wrote on 1 April 1884 that he had "come to the end of my tether" with the operas: "I have been continually keeping down the music in order that not one [syllable] should be lost. ...  I should like to set a story of human interest & probability where the humorous words would come in a humorous (not serious) situation, & where, if the situation were a tender or dramatic one the words would be of similar character." In a lengthy exchange of correspondence, Sullivan pronounced Gilbert's plot sketch (particularly the "lozenge" element) unacceptably mechanical, and too similar in both its grotesque "elements of topsyturveydom" and in actual plot to their earlier work, especially The Sorcerer. He repeatedly requested that Gilbert find a new subject. The impasse was finally resolved on 8 May when Gilbert proposed a plot that did not depend on any supernatural device. The result was Gilbert and Sullivan's most successful work, The Mikado (1885). The piece ran for 672 performances, which was the second-longest run for any work of musical theatre, and one of the longest runs of any theatre piece, up to that time.

Later 1880s

In 1886 Sullivan composed his second and last large-scale choral work of the decade. It was a cantata for the Leeds Festival, The Golden Legend, based on Longfellow's poem of the same name. Apart from the comic operas, this proved to be Sullivan's best received full-length work. It was given hundreds of performances during his lifetime, and at one point he declared a moratorium on its presentation, fearing that it would become over-exposed. Only Handel's Messiah was performed more often in Britain in the 1880s and 1890s. It remained in the repertory until about the 1920s, but since then it has seldom been performed; it received its first professional recording in 2001. The musical scholar and conductor David Russell Hulme writes that the work influenced Elgar and Walton.

Ruddigore followed The Mikado at the Savoy in 1887. It was profitable, but its nine-month run was disappointing compared with most of the earlier Savoy operas. For their next piece, Gilbert submitted another version of the magic lozenge plot, which Sullivan again rejected. Gilbert finally proposed a comparatively serious opera, to which Sullivan agreed.  Although it was not a grand opera, The Yeomen of the Guard (1888) provided him with the opportunity to compose his most ambitious stage work to date. As early as 1883 Sullivan had been under pressure from the musical establishment to write a grand opera. In 1885 he told an interviewer, "The opera of the future is a compromise [among the French, German and Italian schools] – a sort of eclectic school, a selection of the merits of each one. I myself will make an attempt to produce a grand opera of this new school. ... Yes, it will be an historical work, and it is the dream of my life." After The Yeomen of the Guard opened, Sullivan turned again to Shakespeare, composing incidental music for Henry Irving's Lyceum Theatre production of Macbeth (1888).

Sullivan wished to produce further serious works with Gilbert. He had collaborated with no other librettist since 1875. But Gilbert felt that the reaction to The Yeomen of the Guard had "not been so convincing as to warrant us in assuming that the public want something more earnest still". He proposed instead that Sullivan should go ahead with his plan to write a grand opera, but should continue also to compose comic works for the Savoy. Sullivan was not immediately persuaded. He replied, "I have lost the liking for writing comic opera, and entertain very grave doubts as to my power of doing it." Nevertheless, Sullivan soon commissioned a grand opera libretto from Julian Sturgis (who was recommended by Gilbert), and suggested to Gilbert that he revive an old idea for an opera set in colourful Venice. The comic opera was completed first: The Gondoliers (1889) was a piece described by Gervase Hughes as a pinnacle of Sullivan's achievement. It was the last great Gilbert and Sullivan success.

1890s

The relationship between Gilbert and Sullivan suffered its most serious breach in April 1890, during the run of The Gondoliers, when Gilbert objected to Carte's financial accounts for the production, including a charge to the partnership for the cost of new carpeting for the Savoy Theatre lobby. Gilbert believed that this was a maintenance expense that should be charged to Carte alone. Carte was building a new theatre to present Sullivan's forthcoming grand opera, and Sullivan sided with Carte, going so far as to sign an affidavit that contained erroneous information about old debts of the partnership. Gilbert took legal action against Carte and Sullivan, vowing to write no more for the Savoy, and so the partnership came to an acrimonious end. Sullivan wrote to Gilbert in September 1890 that he was "physically and mentally ill over this wretched business. I have not yet got over the shock of seeing our names coupled ... in hostile antagonism over a few miserable pounds".

Sullivan's only grand opera, Ivanhoe, based on Walter Scott's novel, opened at Carte's new Royal English Opera House on 31 January 1891. Sullivan completed the score too late to meet Carte's planned production date, and costs mounted; Sullivan was required to pay Carte a contractual penalty of £3,000 for his delay. The production lasted for 155 consecutive performances, an unprecedented run for a grand opera, and earned good notices for its music. Afterwards, Carte was unable to fill the new opera house with other opera productions and sold the theatre. Despite the initial success of Ivanhoe, some writers blamed it for the failure of the opera house, and it soon passed into obscurity. Herman Klein called the episode "the strangest comingling of success and failure ever chronicled in the history of British lyric enterprise!" Later in 1891 Sullivan composed music for Tennyson's The Foresters, which ran well at Daly's Theatre in New York in 1892, but failed in London the following year.

Sullivan returned to comic opera, but because of the fracture with Gilbert, he and Carte sought other collaborators. Sullivan's next piece was Haddon Hall (1892), with a libretto by Sydney Grundy based loosely on the legend of the elopement of Dorothy Vernon with John Manners. Although still comic, the tone and style of the work was considerably more serious and romantic than most of the operas with Gilbert. It ran for 204 performances, and was praised by critics. In 1895 Sullivan once more provided incidental music for the Lyceum, this time for J. Comyns Carr's .

With the aid of an intermediary, Sullivan's music publisher Tom Chappell, the three partners were reunited in 1892. Their next opera, Utopia, Limited (1893), ran for 245 performances, barely covering the expenses of the lavish production, although it was the longest run at the Savoy in the 1890s. Sullivan came to disapprove of the leading lady, Nancy McIntosh, and refused to write another piece featuring her; Gilbert insisted that she must appear in his next opera. Instead, Sullivan teamed up again with his old partner, F. C. Burnand. The Chieftain (1894), a heavily revised version of their earlier two-act opera, The Contrabandista, flopped. Gilbert and Sullivan reunited one more time, after McIntosh announced her retirement from the stage, for The Grand Duke (1896). It failed, and Sullivan never worked with Gilbert again, although their operas continued to be revived with success at the Savoy.

In May 1897 Sullivan's full-length ballet, Victoria and Merrie England, opened at the Alhambra Theatre to celebrate the Queen's Diamond Jubilee. The work celebrates English history and culture, with the Victorian period as the grand finale. Its six-month run was considered a great achievement. The Beauty Stone (1898), with a libretto by Arthur Wing Pinero and J. Comyns Carr, was based on mediaeval morality plays. The collaboration did not go well: Sullivan wrote that Pinero and Comyns Carr were "gifted and brilliant men, with no experience in writing for music", and, when he asked for alterations to improve the structure, they refused. The opera, moreover, was too serious for the Savoy audiences' tastes. It was a critical failure and ran for only seven weeks.

In 1899, to benefit "the wives and children of soldiers and sailors" on active service in the Boer War, Sullivan composed the music of a song, "The Absent-Minded Beggar", to a text by Rudyard Kipling, which became an instant sensation and raised an unprecedented £300,000 for the fund from performances and the sale of sheet music and related merchandise. In The Rose of Persia (1899), Sullivan returned to his comic roots, writing to a libretto by Basil Hood that combined an exotic Arabian Nights setting with plot elements of The Mikado. Sullivan's tuneful score was well received, and the opera proved to be his most successful full-length collaboration apart from those with Gilbert. Another opera with Hood, The Emerald Isle, quickly went into preparation, but Sullivan died before it was completed. The score was finished by Edward German, and produced in 1901.

Death, honours and legacy

Sullivan's health was never robust – from his thirties his kidney disease often obliged him to conduct sitting down. He died of heart failure, following an attack of bronchitis, at his flat in London on 22 November 1900. His Te Deum Laudamus, written in expectation of victory in the Boer War, was performed posthumously.

A monument in the composer's memory featuring a weeping Muse was erected in the Victoria Embankment Gardens in London and is inscribed with Gilbert's words from The Yeomen of the Guard: "Is life a boon? If so, it must befall that Death, whene'er he call, must call too soon". Sullivan wished to be buried in Brompton Cemetery with his parents and brother, but by order of the Queen he was buried in St Paul's Cathedral. In addition to his knighthood, honours awarded to Sullivan in his lifetime included Doctor in Music, honoris causa, by the Universities of Cambridge (1876) and Oxford (1879); Chevalier, Légion d'honneur, France (1878); Order of the Medjidie conferred by the Sultan of Turkey (1888); and appointment as a Member of the Fourth Class of the Royal Victorian Order (MVO) in 1897.

Sullivan's operas have often been adapted, first in the 19th century as dance pieces and in foreign adaptations of the operas themselves. Since then, his music has been made into ballets (Pineapple Poll (1951) and Pirates of Penzance – The Ballet! (1991)) and musicals (The Swing Mikado (1938), The Hot Mikado (1939) and Hot Mikado (1986), Hollywood Pinafore and Memphis Bound (both 1945), The Black Mikado (1975), etc.). His operas are frequently performed, and also parodied, pastiched, quoted and imitated in comedy routines, advertising, law, film, television, and other popular media. He has been portrayed on screen in The Story of Gilbert and Sullivan (1953) and Topsy-Turvy (2000). He is celebrated not only for writing the Savoy operas and his other works, but also for his influence on the development of modern American and British musical theatre.

Personal life

Romantic life

Sullivan never married, but he had serious love affairs with several women. The first was with Rachel Scott Russell (1845–1882), the daughter of the engineer John Scott Russell. Sullivan was a frequent visitor at the Scott Russell home in the mid-1860s, and by 1865 the affair was in full bloom. Rachel's parents did not approve of a possible union with a young composer of uncertain financial prospects, but the two continued to see each other covertly. At some point in 1868 Sullivan started a simultaneous (and secret) affair with Rachel's sister Louise (1841–1878). Both relationships ended by early 1869.

Sullivan's longest love affair was with the American socialite Fanny Ronalds, a woman three years his senior, who had two children. He met her in Paris around 1867, and the affair began in earnest soon after she moved to London in 1871. According to a contemporary description of Ronalds, "Her face was perfectly divine in its loveliness, her features small and exquisitely regular. Her hair was a dark shade of brown – châtain foncé [deep chestnut] – and very abundant ... a lovely woman, with the most generous smile one could possibly imagine, and the most beautiful teeth." Sullivan called her "the best amateur singer in London". She often performed Sullivan's songs at her famous Sunday soirées. She became particularly associated with "The Lost Chord", singing it both in private and in public, often with Sullivan accompanying her. When Sullivan died, he left her the autograph manuscript of that song, along with other bequests.

Ronalds was separated from her American husband, but they never divorced. Social conventions of the time compelled Sullivan and Ronalds to keep their relationship private. She apparently became pregnant at least twice and procured abortions in 1882 and 1884. Sullivan had a roving eye, and his diary records the occasional quarrels when Ronalds discovered his other liaisons, but he always returned to her. Around 1889 or 1890 the sexual relationship evidently ended – he started to refer to her in his diary as "Auntie" – but she remained a constant companion for the rest of his life.

In 1896 the 54-year-old Sullivan proposed marriage to the 22-year-old Violet Beddington (1874–1962), but she refused him.

Leisure and family life

Sullivan loved to spend time in France (both in Paris and on the Riviera), where his acquaintances included European royalty and where the casinos enabled him to indulge his passion for gambling. He enjoyed hosting private dinners and entertainments at his home, often featuring famous singers and well-known actors. In 1865 he was initiated into Freemasonry and was Grand Organist of the United Grand Lodge of England in 1887 during Queen Victoria's Golden Jubilee. Sullivan's talent and native charm gained him the friendship of many, not only in the musical establishment, such as Grove, Chorley and Herman Klein, but also in society circles, such as Alfred, Duke of Edinburgh. Sullivan enjoyed playing tennis; according to George Grossmith, "I have seen some bad lawn-tennis players in my time, but I never saw anyone so bad as Arthur Sullivan".

Sullivan was devoted to his parents, particularly his mother. He corresponded regularly with her when away from London, until her death in 1882. Henry Lytton wrote, "I believe there was never a more affectionate tie than that which existed between [Sullivan] and his mother, a very witty old lady, and one who took an exceptional pride in her son's accomplishments." Sullivan was also very fond of his brother Fred, whose acting career he assisted whenever possible, and of Fred's children. After Fred died at the age of 39, leaving his pregnant wife, Charlotte, with seven children under the age of 14, Sullivan visited the family often and became guardian to the children.

In 1883 Charlotte and six of her children emigrated to Los Angeles, California, leaving the oldest boy, "Bertie", in Sullivan's sole care. Despite his reservations about the move to the United States, Sullivan paid all the costs and gave substantial financial support to the family. A year later, Charlotte died, leaving the children to be raised mostly by her brother. From June to August 1885, after The Mikado opened, Sullivan visited the family in Los Angeles and took them on a sightseeing trip of the American west. Throughout the rest of his life, and in his will, he contributed financially to Fred's children, continuing to correspond with them and to be concerned with their education, marriages and financial affairs. Bertie remained with his Uncle Arthur for the rest of the composer's life.

Three of Sullivan's cousins, the daughters of his uncle John Thomas Sullivan, performed with the D'Oyly Carte Opera Company: Rose, Jane ("Jennie") and Kate Sullivan, the first two of whom used the stage surname Hervey. Kate was a chorister who defected to the Comedy Opera Company's rival production of H.M.S. Pinafore, where she had the opportunity to play the leading soprano role, Josephine, in 1879. Jennie was a D'Oyly Carte chorister for fourteen years. Rose took principal roles in many of the companion pieces that played with the Savoy operas.

Music

Sullivan's works comprise 24 operas, 11 full orchestral works, ten choral works and oratorios, two ballets, one song cycle, incidental music to several plays, more than 70 hymns and anthems, over 80 songs and parlour ballads, and a body of part songs, carols, and piano and chamber pieces. The operatic output spanned his whole career, as did that of his songs and religious music. The solo piano and chamber pieces are mostly from his early years, and are generally in a Mendelssohnian style. With the exception of his Imperial March, composed for a royal occasion in 1893, the large-scale orchestral concert works also date from early in the composer's career.

Influences
Reviewers and scholars often cite Mendelssohn as the most important influence on Sullivan. The music for The Tempest and the Irish Symphony, among other works, was seen by contemporary writers as strikingly Mendelssohnian. Percy Young writes that Sullivan's early affection for Mendelssohn remained evident throughout his composing career. Hughes remarks that although Sullivan emulated Mendelssohn in certain ways he seldom "lapsed into those harmonic clichés which mar some of Mendelssohn's more sentimental effusions". When The Tempest music was first presented the Neue Zeitschrift für Musik identified Schumann as a stronger influence, and Benedict Taylor, writing in 2017, concurs. In a 2009 study Taylor adds Schubert as another major influence on Sullivan in his orchestral works, although "from the beginning ... there is the peculiar, intangible stamp of Sullivan emerging confidently". Meinhard Saremba notes that from Sullivan's first meeting with Rossini in Paris, in 1862, Rossini's output became a model for Sullivan's comic opera music, "as evidenced in several rhythmic patterns and constructions of long finales".

As a young man, Sullivan's conservative musical education led him to follow in the conventions of his predecessors. Later he became more adventurous; Richard Silverman, writing in 2009, points to the influence of Liszt in later works – a harmonic ambiguity and chromaticism – so that by the time of The Golden Legend Sullivan had abandoned a home key altogether for the prelude. Sullivan disliked much of Wagner's Musikdrama, but he modelled the overture to The Yeomen of the Guard on the prelude of Die Meistersinger, which he described as "the greatest comic opera ever written". Saremba writes that in works from his middle and later years, Sullivan was inspired by Verdi's example both in details of orchestration, and in la tinta musical – the individual musical character of a piece – ranging from the "nautical air of H.M.S Pinafore" to "the swift Mediterranean lightness of The Gondoliers" and "the bleakness of Torquilstone in Ivanhoe".

Method of composition and text setting
Sullivan told an interviewer, Arthur Lawrence, "I don't use the piano in composition – that would limit me terribly". Sullivan explained that his process was not to wait for inspiration, but "to dig for it. ... I decide on [the rhythm] before I come to the question of melody. ... I mark out the metre in dots and dashes, and not until I have quite settled on the rhythm do I proceed to actual notation." Sullivan's text setting, compared with that of his 19th century English predecessors or his European contemporaries, was "vastly more sensitive. ... Sullivan's operatic style attempts to create for itself a uniquely English text-music synthesis", and, in addition, by adopting a conservative musical style, he was able to achieve "the clarity to match Gilbert's finely honed wit with musical wit of his own".

In composing the Savoy operas, Sullivan wrote the vocal lines of the musical numbers first, and these were given to the actors. He, or an assistant, improvised a piano accompaniment at the early rehearsals; he wrote the orchestrations later, after he had seen what Gilbert's stage business would be. He left the overtures until last and sometimes delegated their composition, based on his outlines, to his assistants, often adding his suggestions or corrections. Those Sullivan wrote himself include Thespis, Iolanthe, Princess Ida, The Yeomen of the Guard, The Gondoliers, The Grand Duke and probably Utopia, Limited. Most of the overtures are structured as a pot-pourri of tunes from the operas in three sections: fast, slow and fast. Those for Iolanthe and The Yeomen of the Guard are written in a modified sonata form.

Melody and rhythm
The Musical Times noted that Sullivan's tunes, at least in the comic operas, appeal to the professional as much as to the layman: his continental contemporaries such as Saint-Saëns and the Viennese critic Eduard Hanslick held the Savoy operas in high regard. Hughes writes, "When Sullivan wrote what we call 'a good tune' it was nearly always 'good music' as well. Outside the ranks of the giants there are few other composers of whom the same could be said." Although his melodies sprang from rhythm, some of his themes may have been prompted by his chosen instrumentation or his harmonic techniques.

In the comic operas, where many numbers are in verse-plus-refrain form, Sullivan shaped his melodies to provide a climax for the verse, capped by an overall climax in the refrain. Hughes cites "If you go in" (Iolanthe) as an example. He adds that Sullivan rarely reached the same class of excellence in instrumental works, where he had no librettist to feed his imagination. Even with Gilbert, on those occasions when the librettist wrote in unvaried metre, Sullivan often followed suit and produced phrases of simple repetition, such as in "Love Is a Plaintive Song" (Patience) and "A Man Who Would Woo a Fair Maid" (The Yeomen of the Guard).

Sullivan preferred to write in major keys, overwhelmingly in the Savoy operas, and even in his serious works. Examples of his rare excursions into minor keys include the long E minor melody in the first movement of the Irish Symphony, "Go Away, Madam" in the Act I finale of Iolanthe (echoing Verdi and Beethoven) and the execution march in the Act I finale of The Yeomen of the Guard.

Harmony and counterpoint
Sullivan was trained in the classical style, and contemporary music did not greatly attract him. Harmonically his early works used the conventional formulae of early-nineteenth-century composers including Mendelssohn, Auber, Donizetti, Balfe and Schubert. Hughes comments that harmonic contrast in the Savoy works is enhanced by Sullivan's characteristic modulation between keys, as in "Expressive Glances" (Princess Ida), where he negotiates smoothly E major, C sharp minor and C major, or "Then One of Us will Be a Queen" (The Gondoliers), where he writes in F major, D flat major and D minor.

When reproached for using consecutive fifths in Cox and Box, Sullivan replied "if 5ths turn up it doesn't matter, so long as there is no offence to the ear." Both Hughes and Jacobs in Grove's Dictionary of Music and Musicians comment adversely on Sullivan's overuse of tonic pedals, usually in the bass, which Hughes attributes to "lack of enterprise or even downright laziness". Another Sullivan trademark criticised by Hughes is the repeated use of the chord of the augmented fourth at moments of pathos. In his serious works, Sullivan attempted to avoid harmonic devices associated with the Savoy operas, with the result, according to Hughes, that The Golden Legend is a "hotch-potch of harmonic styles".

One of Sullivan's best-known devices is what Jacobs terms his "'counterpoint of characters': the presentation by different personages of two seemingly independent tunes which later come together" simultaneously. He was not the first composer to combine themes in this way, but in Jacobs's phrase it became almost "the trademark of Sullivan's operetta style". Sometimes the melodies were for solo voices, as in "I Am So Proud" (The Mikado), which combines three melodic lines. Other examples are in choruses, where typically a graceful tune for the women is combined with a robust one for the men. Examples include "When the Foeman Bares his Steel" (The Pirates of Penzance), "In a Doleful Train" (Patience) and "Welcome, Gentry" (Ruddigore). In "How Beautifully Blue the Sky" (The Pirates of Penzance), one theme is given to the chorus (in 2/4 time) and the other to solo voices (in 3/4).

Sullivan rarely composed fugues. Examples are from the "Epilogue" to The Golden Legend and Victoria and Merrie England. In the Savoy operas, fugal style is reserved for making fun of legal solemnity in Trial by Jury and Iolanthe (e.g., the Lord Chancellor's leitmotif in the latter). Less formal counterpoint is employed in numbers such as "Brightly Dawns Our Wedding Day" (The Mikado) and "When the Buds Are Blossoming" (Ruddigore).

Orchestration
Hughes concludes his chapter on Sullivan's orchestration: "[I]n this vitally important sector of the composer's art he deserves to rank as a master." Sullivan was a competent player of at least four orchestral instruments (flute, clarinet, trumpet and trombone) and technically a most skilful orchestrator. Though sometimes inclined to indulge in grandiosity when writing for a full symphony orchestra, he was adept in using smaller forces to the maximum effect. Young writes that orchestral players generally like playing Sullivan's music: "Sullivan never asked his players to do what was either uncongenial or impracticable."

Sullivan's orchestra for the Savoy operas was typical of the theatre orchestra of his era: 2 flutes (+ piccolo), oboe, 2 clarinets, bassoon, 2 horns, 2 cornets, 2 trombones, timpani, percussion and strings. According to Geoffrey Toye, the number of players in Sullivan's Savoy Theatre orchestras was a "minimum" of 31. Sullivan argued hard for an increase in the pit orchestra's size, and, starting with The Yeomen of the Guard, the orchestra was augmented with a second bassoon and a second tenor trombone. He generally orchestrated each score at almost the last moment, noting that the accompaniment for an opera had to wait until he saw the staging, so that he could judge how heavily or lightly to orchestrate each part of the music. For his large-scale orchestral pieces, which often employed very large forces, Sullivan added a second oboe part, sometimes double bassoon and bass clarinet, more horns, trumpets, tuba, and occasionally an organ and/or a harp.

One of the most recognisable features in Sullivan's orchestration is his woodwind scoring. Hughes especially notes Sullivan's clarinet writing, exploiting all registers and colours of the instrument, and his particular fondness for oboe solos. For instance, the Irish Symphony contains two long solo oboe passages in succession, and in the Savoy operas there are many shorter examples. In the operas, and also in concert works, another characteristic Sullivan touch is his fondness for pizzicato passages for the string sections. Hughes instances "Kind Sir, You Cannot Have the Heart" (The Gondoliers), "Free From his Fetters Grim" (The Yeomen of the Guard) and "In Vain to Us You Plead" (Iolanthe).

Musical quotations and parodies

Throughout the Savoy operas, and occasionally in other works, Sullivan quotes or imitates well-known themes or parodies the styles of famous composers. On occasion he may have echoed his predecessors unconsciously: Hughes cites a Handelian influence in "Hereupon We're Both Agreed" (The Yeomen of the Guard), and Rodney Milnes called "Sighing Softly" in The Pirates of Penzance "a song plainly inspired by – and indeed worthy of – Sullivan's hero, Schubert". Edward Greenfield found a theme in the slow movement of the Irish Symphony "an outrageous crib" from Schubert's Unfinished Symphony. In early pieces, Sullivan drew on Mendelssohn's style in his music for The Tempest, Auber's in his Henry VIII music and Gounod's in The Light of the World. The influence of Mendelssohn pervades the fairy music in Iolanthe. The Golden Legend shows the influence of Liszt and Wagner.

Sullivan adopted traditional musical forms, such as madrigals in The Mikado, Ruddigore and The Yeomen of the Guard and glees in H.M.S. Pinafore and The Mikado, and the Venetian barcarolle in The Gondoliers. He made use of dance styles to enhance the sense of time or place in various scenes: gavottes in Ruddigore and The Gondoliers; a country dance in The Sorcerer; a nautical hornpipe in Ruddigore; and the Spanish cachucha and Italian saltarello and tarantella in The Gondoliers. Occasionally he drew on influences from further afield. In The Mikado, he used an old Japanese war song, and his 1882 trip to Egypt inspired musical styles in his later opera The Rose of Persia.

Elsewhere, Sullivan wrote undisguised parody. Of the sextet "I Hear the Soft Note" in Patience, he said to the singers, "I think you will like this. It is Dr Arne and Purcell at their best." In his comic operas, he followed Offenbach's lead in lampooning the idioms of French and Italian opera, such as those of Donizetti, Bellini and Verdi. Examples of his operatic parody include Mabel's aria "Poor Wand'ring One" in The Pirates of Penzance, the duet "Who Are You, Sir?" from Cox and Box, and the whispered plans for elopement in "This Very Night" in H.M.S. Pinafore, parodying the conspirators' choruses in Verdi's Il trovatore and Rigoletto. The mock-jingoistic "He Is an Englishman" in H.M.S. Pinafore and choral passages in The Zoo satirise patriotic British tunes such as Arne's "Rule, Britannia!". The chorus "With Catlike Tread" from The Pirates parodies Verdi's "Anvil Chorus" from Il trovatore.

Hughes calls Bouncer's song in Cox and Box "a jolly Handelian parody" and notes a strong Handelian flavour to Arac's song in Act III of Princess Ida. In "A More Humane Mikado", at the words "Bach interwoven with Spohr and Beethoven", the clarinet and bassoon quote the fugue subject of Bach's Fantasia and Fugue in G minor. Sullivan sometimes used Wagnerian leitmotifs for both comic and dramatic effect. In Iolanthe, a distinctive four-note theme is associated with the title character, the Lord Chancellor has a fugal motif, and the Fairy Queen's music parodies that of Wagner heroines such as Brünnhilde. In The Yeomen of the Guard the Tower of London is evoked by its own motif. This use of the leitmotif technique is repeated and developed further in Ivanhoe.

Reputation and criticism

Early reception
Sullivan's critical reputation has undergone extreme changes since the 1860s when critics, struck by his potential, hailed him as the long-awaited great English composer. His incidental music to The Tempest was received with acclaim at the Crystal Palace, just before his 20th birthday, in April 1862. The Athenaeum commented:

His Irish Symphony of 1866 won similarly enthusiastic praise, but as Arthur Jacobs notes, "The first rapturous outburst of enthusiasm for Sullivan as an orchestral composer did not last." A comment typical of those that followed him throughout his career was that "Sullivan's unquestionable talent should make him doubly careful not to mistake popular applause for artistic appreciation."

When Sullivan turned to comic opera with Gilbert, the serious critics began to express disapproval. The music critic Peter Gammond writes of "misapprehensions and prejudices, delivered to our door by the Victorian firm Musical Snobs Ltd. ... frivolity and high spirits were sincerely seen as elements that could not be exhibited by anyone who was to be admitted to the sanctified society of Art." As early as 1877 The London Figaro commented that Sullivan "wilfully throws his opportunity away. ... He possesses all the natural ability to have given us an English opera, and, instead, he affords us a little more-or-less excellent fooling." Few critics denied the excellence of Sullivan's theatre scores. The Theatre commented, "Iolanthe sustains Dr. Sullivan's reputation as the most spontaneous, fertile, and scholarly composer of comic opera this country has ever produced."  Comic opera, no matter how skilfully crafted, was viewed as an intrinsically lower form of art than oratorio. The Athenaeum's review of The Martyr of Antioch declared: "[I]t is an advantage to have the composer of H.M.S. Pinafore occupying himself with a worthier form of art."

Knighthood and later years
Sullivan's knighthood in 1883 gave the serious music critics further ammunition. The Musical Review of that year observed:

Even Sullivan's friend George Grove wrote: "Surely the time has come when so able and experienced a master of voice, orchestra, and stage effect – master, too, of so much genuine sentiment – may apply his gifts to a serious opera on some subject of abiding human or natural interest." Sullivan finally redeemed himself in critical eyes with The Golden Legend in 1886. The Observer hailed it as a "triumph of English art". The World called it "one of the greatest creations we have had for many years. Original, bold, inspired, grand in conception, in execution, in treatment, it is a composition which will make an 'epoch' and which will carry the name of its composer higher on the wings of fame and glory. ... The effect of the public performance was unprecedented."

Hopes for a new departure were expressed in The Daily Telegraph's review of The Yeomen of the Guard (1888), Sullivan's most serious opera to that point: "[T]he music follows the book to a higher plane, and we have a genuine English opera, forerunner of many others, let us hope, and possibly significant of an advance towards a national lyric stage." Sullivan's only grand opera, Ivanhoe (1891), received generally favourable reviews, although J. A. Fuller Maitland, in The Times, expressed reservations, writing that the opera's "best portions rise so far above anything else that Sir Arthur Sullivan has given to the world, and have such force and dignity, that it is not difficult to forget the drawbacks which may be found in the want of interest in much of the choral writing, and the brevity of the concerted solo parts." Sullivan's 1897 ballet Victoria and Merrie England was one of several late pieces that won praise from most critics:    

Although the more solemn members of the musical establishment could not forgive Sullivan for writing music that was both comic and accessible, he was, nevertheless, "the nation's de facto composer laureate". His obituary in The Times called him England's "most conspicuous composer ... the musician who had such power to charm all classes. ... The critic and the student found new beauties at every fresh hearing. What ... set Sullivan in popular esteem far above all the other English composers of his day was the tunefulness of his music, that quality in it by which ... [it] was immediately recognized as a joyous contribution to the gaiety of life. ... Sullivan’s name stood as a synonym for music in England.

Posthumous reputation

In the decade after his death, Sullivan's reputation sank considerably among music critics. In 1901 Fuller Maitland took issue with the generally laudatory tone of the obituaries: "Is there anywhere a case quite parallel to that of Sir Arthur Sullivan, who began his career with a work which at once stamped him as a genius, and to the height of which he only rarely attained throughout life? ...  It is because such great natural gifts – gifts greater, perhaps, than fell to any English musician since ... Purcell – were so very seldom employed in work worthy of them." Edward Elgar, to whom Sullivan had been particularly kind, rose to Sullivan's defence, branding Fuller Maitland's obituary "the shady side of musical criticism ... that foul unforgettable episode".

Fuller Maitland's followers, including Ernest Walker, also dismissed Sullivan as "merely the idle singer of an empty evening". As late as 1966 Frank Howes, a music critic for The Times, condemned Sullivan for a "lack of sustained effort ... a fundamental lack of seriousness towards his art [and] inability to perceive the smugness, the sentimentality and banality of the Mendelssohnian detritus ... to remain content with the flattest and most obvious rhythms, this yielding to a fatal facility, that excludes Sullivan from the ranks of the good composers." Thomas Dunhill wrote in 1928 that Sullivan's "music has suffered in an extraordinary degree from the vigorous attacks which have been made upon it in professional circles. These attacks have succeeded in surrounding the composer with a kind of barricade of prejudice which must be swept away before justice can be done to his genius."

Sir Henry Wood continued to perform Sullivan's serious music. In 1942 Wood presented a Sullivan centenary concert at the Royal Albert Hall, but it was not until the 1960s that Sullivan's music other than the Savoy operas began to be widely revived. In 1960 Hughes published the first full-length book about Sullivan's music "which, while taking note of his weaknesses (which are many) and not hesitating to castigate his lapses from good taste (which were comparatively rare) [attempted] to view them in perspective against the wider background of his sound musicianship." The work of the Sir Arthur Sullivan Society, founded in 1977, and books about Sullivan by musicians such as Young (1971) and Jacobs (1986) contributed to the re-evaluation of Sullivan's serious music. The Irish Symphony had its first professional recording in 1968, and many of Sullivan's non-Gilbert works have since been recorded. Scholarly critical editions of an increasing number of Sullivan's works have been published.

In 1957 a review in The Times explained Sullivan's contributions to "the continued vitality of the Savoy operas": "Gilbert's lyrics ... take on extra point and sparkle when set to Sullivan's music. ... [Sullivan, too, is] a delicate wit, whose airs have a precision, a neatness, a grace, and a flowing melody". A 2000 article in The Musical Times by Nigel Burton noted the resurgence of Sullivan's reputation beyond the comic operas:

Recordings

On 14 August 1888 George Gouraud introduced Thomas Edison's phonograph to London in a press conference, including the playing of a piano and cornet recording of Sullivan's "The Lost Chord", one of the first recordings of music ever made. At a party on 5 October 1888 given to demonstrate the technology, Sullivan recorded a speech to be sent to Edison, saying, in part: "I am astonished and somewhat terrified at the result of this evening's experiments: astonished at the wonderful power you have developed, and terrified at the thought that so much hideous and bad music may be put on record forever. But all the same I think it is the most wonderful thing that I have ever experienced, and I congratulate you with all my heart on this wonderful discovery." These recordings were found in the Edison Library in New Jersey in the 1950s:

The first commercial recordings of Sullivan's music, beginning in 1898, were of individual numbers from the Savoy operas. In 1917 the Gramophone Company (HMV) produced the first album of a complete Gilbert and Sullivan opera, The Mikado, followed by eight more. Electrical recordings of most of the operas issued by HMV and Victor followed from the 1920s, supervised by Rupert D'Oyly Carte. The D'Oyly Carte Opera Company continued to produce recordings until 1979. After the copyrights expired, recordings were made by opera companies such as Gilbert and Sullivan for All and Australian Opera, and Sir Malcolm Sargent and Sir Charles Mackerras each conducted audio sets of several Savoy operas. Since 1994, the International Gilbert and Sullivan Festival has released professional and amateur CDs and videos of its productions and other Sullivan recordings, and Ohio Light Opera has recorded several of the operas in the 21st century.

Sullivan's non-Savoy works were infrequently recorded until the 1960s. A few of his songs were put on disc in the early years of the 20th century, including versions of "The Lost Chord" by Enrico Caruso and Clara Butt. The first of many recordings of the Overture di Ballo was made in 1932, conducted by Sargent. The Irish Symphony was first recorded in 1968 under Sir Charles Groves. Since then, much of Sullivan's serious music and his operas without Gilbert have been recorded, including the Cello Concerto by Julian Lloyd Webber (1986); and The Rose of Persia (1999); The Golden Legend (2001); Ivanhoe (2009); and The Masque at Kenilworth and On Shore and Sea (2014), conducted by, respectively, Tom Higgins, Ronald Corp, David Lloyd-Jones and Richard Bonynge. In 2017 Chandos Records released an album, Songs, which includes The Window and 35 individual Sullivan songs. Mackerras's Sullivan ballet, Pineapple Poll, has received many recordings since its first performance in 1951.

See also
 List of compositions by Arthur Sullivan
 People associated with Gilbert and Sullivan

Notes and references

Notes

References

Sources

Further reading

External links

General
 Extensive list of links to Sullivan works and materials, Gilbert and Sullivan Archive
 Sir Arthur Sullivan Society
 Detailed 1879 article about Sullivan
 "The Other Side of Sullivan", lecture by Robin Wilson, 2008.

Music
 
 
 
 Sullivan manuscript scores at The Morgan Library
 

 
1842 births
1900 deaths
19th-century British composers
19th-century classical composers
19th-century English musicians
19th-century British male musicians
Alumni of the Royal Academy of Music
British ballet composers
Burials at St Paul's Cathedral
Composers awarded knighthoods
English Anglicans
English classical composers
English male classical composers
English opera composers
English people of Irish descent
English people of Italian descent
English Romantic composers
Freemasons of the United Grand Lodge of England
 
Knights Bachelor
Male opera composers
Oratorio composers
People from Lambeth
University of Music and Theatre Leipzig alumni